Langadu is an upazila of Rangamati District in the Division of Chittagong, Bangladesh.

Geography
It has 10571 households and total area 388.5 km2.

Demographics
As of the 1991 Bangladesh census, Langadu had a population of 54,490. Males constitute 53.01% of the population, and females 46.99%. This upazila's eighteen up population is 26,617. Langadu has an average literacy rate of 27.5% (7+ years).

Administration
Langadu Upazila is divided into seven union parishads: Atarakchara, Bogachattar, Gulshakhali, Kalapakujja, Langadu, Maeinimukh, and Vasannadam. The union parishads are subdivided into 25 mauzas and 138 villages.

Education
 Rabeta Model High School
 Mainimukh Model Government High School
 Baitush Sharaf Adarsha Dakhil Madrasah
 Goilshakhali Model High School
 Langadu Model College

See also
 Upazilas of Bangladesh
 Districts of Bangladesh
 Divisions of Bangladesh

References

Upazilas of Rangamati Hill District